21 Bridges is a 2019 American action thriller film directed by Brian Kirk and written by Adam Mervis and Matthew Michael Carnahan, based on a story by Mervis. The film stars Chadwick Boseman as an NYPD Detective who shuts down the 21 river crossings of Manhattan to find two suspected cop killers, portrayed by Stephan James and Taylor Kitsch. Sienna Miller, Keith David and J. K. Simmons appear in supporting roles. The film was produced by brothers Joe and Anthony Russo, Mike Larocca, Robert Simonds, Gigi Pritzker, Boseman (in his only producing credit) and Logan Coles.

The project was announced as 17 Bridges in July 2018. Principal photography began on September 24, 2018 in New York City, primarily Brooklyn, and also took place in Philadelphia, Pennsylvania. Several members of the cast joined the film in October 2018, including James and David.

21 Bridges was theatrically released in the United States on November 22, 2019, by STXfilms. It received mixed reviews from critics and grossed $49 million worldwide on a $33 million production budget.

Plot
Andre Davis is a successful NYPD Detective like his father, who was murdered on duty when Davis was 13. Struggling with his father's legacy, Davis has earned a reputation for killing several criminals over the years, although he claims they were all in self-defense and is uncomfortable with the label.

One night, Michael Trujillo and Ray Jackson, two small-time criminals and ex-military soldiers, attempt to steal 30 kilograms of cocaine from a wine shop in Brooklyn. They find three hundred instead, and when a group of officers from the NYPD's 85th Precinct arrives, Ray guns them down in a shootout, killing seven and wounding another, who later dies in the hospital. After they escape into Manhattan with 50 kilograms, Michael chastises Ray for putting them in jeopardy by killing cops. Assigned to the case, Davis and NYPD Narcotics Detective Frankie Burns come into conflict with Sgt. Butchco and Sgt. Dugan, who attempt to allow FBI Special Agents to take it over. Reasoning that the criminals would have to sell the cocaine in Manhattan before escaping the state, Davis secures the reluctant approval of the Deputy Mayor, the FBI, and the precinct's head, Captain McKenna, for Manhattan Island to be locked down until 5 a.m.

As Ray and Michael go with their liaison, Bush, to meet their buyer, Hawk, who gives them $1 million, Davis and Burns manage to identify all three. Bush is soon gunned down by Butchco and Dugan in a nightclub. After catching Butchco planting his backup sidearm on Bush's body and briefly scuffling with him, Davis becomes more suspicious of his colleagues.

Adi, a money launderer, gives Michael and Ray new identities and tells them to depart for Miami the next morning. However, before he can secure their money in an offshore account, a team of NYPD officers led by Lieutenant Kelly manages to locate and raid his apartment. Adi is mortally wounded but gives Michael two flash drives and their password.

Davis and Burns catch up to Michael and Ray; after accidentally killing a civilian, Ray is fatally wounded by Davis. Michael holds Burns at gunpoint, telling Davis about the drives and how suspicious everything is, before escaping. Burns scolds Davis for letting Michael escape despite Davis' reputation. In a hotel room, Michael unlocks the drives, realizing that McKenna's precinct was involved in trafficking the drugs from the winery and earning profits for it, and that some of the cops he and Ray had killed in the shootout had been corrupt. After another chase where Michael abandons his money, Davis manages to corner him on a subway train and convinces him to surrender, promising to keep him alive. Burns, who has also boarded the train, suddenly shoots Michael, claiming when he berates her that she thought Michael was still holding Davis at gunpoint. Michael secretly gives Davis the drives and password before dying. As the police congratulate the two for their efforts, Davis discovers that Burns had contacted Kelly before Adi's apartment was raided.

The next morning, McKenna returns home to find Davis holding him at gunpoint, having accessed the drives. McKenna explains that the officers went into drug trafficking because they were struggling to survive on a measly pay. Davis, refusing to walk away, kills the arriving Butchco, Dugan and Kelly – who were all on McKenna's payroll – then McKenna, who refuses to surrender. Burns, whom Davis deduced was also allied with McKenna, appears from behind and holds Davis at gunpoint, but surrenders after Davis reveals that he had already leaked the information online, exposing all the corrupt cops in New York, and reasons that her daughter would live without her mother should she get a life sentence for killing him.

In the aftermath, Davis solemnly drives along the Manhattan Bridge in the sunset, taking the drives with him.

Cast

Production
On July 11, 2018, it was announced that Chadwick Boseman would star in the film, then known under the title 17 Bridges, with Brian Kirk directing. J. K. Simmons, Sienna Miller and Taylor Kitsch were cast in September. Chris Pratt, Andrew Koji, Will Yun Lee, and Lewis Tan were also considered for roles.

Filming began on September 24, with production occurring between New York City and Philadelphia. Keith David, Morocco Omari, Stephan James and Jamie Neumann joined in October 2018. Sienna Miller would later reveal just after his death that Boseman donated part of his salary to her in order to have her fairly compensated when STX did not meet her requested pay.

Henry Jackman and Alex Belcher composed the film score, with the soundtrack being released by Sony Classical Records.

Release
21 Bridges was released in the United States and Canada on November 22, 2019. It was previously scheduled to be released on July 12 and September 27, 2019.

The film was released in digital download on February 4, 2020 and also released on DVD and Blu-ray on February 18, 2020. Over its first two weeks of release the film totaled $3.2 million in sales.

Reception

Box office
21 Bridges grossed $28.5 million in the United States and Canada, and $21.4 million in other territories, for a worldwide total of $49.9 million, against a production budget of $33 million.

In the United States and Canada, the film was released alongside A Beautiful Day in the Neighborhood and Frozen II, and was projected to gross $10–12 million from 2,655 theaters in its opening weekend. The film made $3.3 million on its first day, including $770,000 from Thursday night previews. It went on to debut to $9.3 million, finishing fourth at the box office. The film fell 37% in its second weekend, making $5.8 million and finishing sixth.

Critical response
The website's critics consensus reads, "21 Bridges covers its beat competently enough, but given its impressive cast, this cop thriller should be more arresting than it is." On Metacritic, the film has a weighted average score of 51 out of 100, based on 32 critics, indicating "mixed or average reviews". Audiences polled by CinemaScore gave the film an average grade of "B+" on an A+ to F scale, while those at PostTrak gave it an average 4 out of 5 stars, with 57% saying they would definitely recommend it.

See also
 Black and Blue
 Films set in New York City
 List of black films of the 2010s
 Run All Night
 The Siege

References

External links 

 

2019 films
2019 action thriller films
2019 crime thriller films
American action thriller films
American crime action films
American crime thriller films
American police films
Casting controversies in film
Salary controversies in film
Films about cocaine
Films about the New York City Police Department
Films about police brutality
Films about police corruption
Films about police misconduct
Films scored by Henry Jackman
Films set in New York City
Films set in Manhattan
Films set in Brooklyn
Films shot in New York City
Films shot in Philadelphia
Films with screenplays by Matthew Michael Carnahan
Hood films
STX Entertainment films
Films directed by Brian Kirk
2010s English-language films
2010s American films